The 1965 Tasman Series was a motor racing competition staged in New Zealand and Australia for cars complying with the Tasman Formula. The series, which began on 9 January and ended on 1 March after seven races, was the second Tasman Series. It was won by Jim Clark, driving Lotus 32B Coventry Climax.

Races

The series was contested over seven races.

Points system 
Points were awarded for the first six positions at each race as shown in the following table.

Each driver could retain points from the New Zealand Grand Prix, the two best performances in the other three New Zealand races, and from all Australian races.

Race positions for which points were earned but not retained are shown on the table below within brackets.

Series standings

References and notes

1965
Tasman Series
Tasman Series